

Denmark
St. Thomas & St. John – Christian Suhm, Governor of St. Thomas & St. John (1747–1758)
St. Croix – Jens Hansen, Governor of St. Croix (1747–1751)

Great Britain
Bahamas – John Tinker, Governor of the Bahamas (1740–1758)
Massachusetts Bay Colony – William Shirley, Governor (1741–1749)

Portugal
 Angola – 
 Joaquim Jacques de Magalhães, Governor of Angola (1738–1748)
 Fonseca Coutinho, Governor of Angola (1748–1749)
 Macau – Jose Placido de Matos Saraiva, Governor of Macau (1747–1749)

Colonial governors
Colonial governors
1748